() is an Arabic word meaning "counsellor" or "advisor". It is related to the word shura, meaning consultation or "taking counsel".

As an official title, it historically indicates a personal advisor to the ruler. In this use it is roughly comparable to the European titles of State Counsellor and Counsellor of State. 

In a military context,  became associated with the idea of the ruler's personal counsellor or advisor on military matters, and as such became the highest rank in Arab countries and the Ottoman Empire. It is used as the highest rank in most armed forces of the Middle East and North Africa, for armies, navies, and air forces. It is therefore equivalent to the ranks of Field Marshal and Admiral of the Fleet.

Iraq
A Mushir was the most senior of all naval officers and the rank was rarely bestowed. The sleeve insignia was the same as a British Admiral of the Fleet.

The rank of Mushir in Iraq is known as "Muhib" and is used in all official and unofficial addresses. Saddam Hussein as commander-in-chief of the Iraqi Armed Forces was an honorary "staff muhib" in the Iraqi army, and the uniform which he typically wore was that of a staff muhib. (Hussein never actually served in the Iraqi Army but commanded as ruler of Iraq.) After Hussein's fall in the 2003 invasion of Iraq, the rank of Mushir became obsolete in the new Iraqi military.

Saudi Arabia
In Saudi Arabia, the rank of Mushir is typically held ceremonially by the House of Saud, and translated as "First class Field Marshal".

List of Egyptian field marshals

Kingdom of Egypt
 Abbas I Hilmi Pasha (1813–1854)
 Ibrahim Pasha (1789–1848)
 Yahya Mansur Yeghen (1837–1913)
 Horatio Herbert Kitchener (1850–1916)
 20 December 1914 – Sultan Hussein Kamel (1853–1917)
 King Fuad I (1868–1936)
 'Aziz 'Ali al-Misri (1879–1965)
 King Farouk (1920–1965)
 1949 – King Abdullah I of Jordan (1882–1951)
 26 July 1952 – King Fuad II (born 1952)
 21 February 1955 – King Hussein of Jordan (1935–1999)

Republic of Egypt
 Abdel Hakim Amer (1919–1967): Active duty
 November 1973 – Ahmad Ismail Ali (1917–1974): Active duty
 Abdel Ghani Elgamasy (1921–2003): Active duty
 Fouad Mohamed Abou Zikry (1923–1983): Honorary
 Mohammed Aly Fahmy (1920–1999): Honorary
 Ahmed Badawi (1927–1981): Posthumously
 1982 – Abd al-Halim Abu Ghazala (1930–2008): Active duty
 1993 – Mohamed Hussein Tantawi (1935–2021): Active duty
 27 January 2014 – Abdel Fattah el-Sisi (born 1954): Active duty

Rank insignia

Current

Historic

See also
 List of field marshals of the Ottoman Empire

References

Military ranks of Egypt
Arab military ranks
Military ranks of the Ottoman Empire
Arabic words and phrases